The 2007–08 season was Olympiacos's 49th consecutive season in the Super League Greece and their 82nd year in existence. The club were played their 11th consecutive season in the UEFA Champions League. Manager Takis Lemonis left the club by mutual consent on 11 March 2008 due to the club's lower-than-expected performance of the team in the Superleague, and was replaced by his assistant, José Segura.

Squad

Winter squad changes
In

 from Levadiakos
 from River Plate
  from Portuguesa

Total spending:  €10,400,000

Out

 to River Plate
 Released by Club
 to Mainz 05
 Released by Club

Total income:  €1,450,000

Out on loan

 to Apollon Kalamarias
 to AEL 1964
 to Leicester City
 to Egaleo
 to OFI Crete
 to KF Tirana

Current national players

 26 (1)
 74 (2)
 21 (0)
 45 (20)
 2 (0)
 3 (0)
 30 (13)
 10 (0)
 84 (0)

Appearances (Goals)

Club

Management

Other information

Competitions

Overall

Super League Greece

Classification

Results summary

Results by round

Matches
All times for domestic competitions at Eastern European Time

1. The match was played on 3 February 2008 and Apollon Kalamarias won 1–0, but due to the illegal appearance of Roman Wallner (Apollon), the result was invalid. It was decided that Olympiacos would be awarded a 3–0 win while Apollon would be punished with one point deducted.

Greek Cup

In the fourth round (round of "32") of the Greek Cup, Olympiacos faced Diagoras from Rhodes, who played in the Third Division. The latter were close to shock the champions who made it to the fifth round with a goal scored in the last minutes of the match. The next opponents were rivals Panathinaikos, who were crushed 4–0 by Olympiacos in an at-capacity Karaiskakis Stadium. In the quarter-finals, Olympiacos eliminated Iraklis 2–0 in the first leg and earning a 2–2 draw in the second. For the semi-finals, Olympiacos faced Thrasyvoulos, winning 2–3 away and 3–1 at home. Olympiacos then faced Aris in the final at the Kaftanzoglio Stadium, Thessaloniki, where they won the Greek Cup after a 2–0 win.

Fourth round

Fifth round

Quarter-finals

Semi-finals

Final

Greek Super Cup
Olympiacos added one more trophy to their long list. The 2006-07 Super League Greece Champions beat the 2006-2007 Greek FA Cup holders, Larissa, 1-0 at the Karaiskakis stadium on October 31, and won the Super Cup for the third time in their history. Kostas Mitroglou scored the winner on 39 minutes after a cross by Soiledis (coach Takis Lemonis decided to give more playing time to the younger players on the team) while Galletti missed out on an opportunity when his shot hit the bar on 81 minutes. The final attracted only 7,141 fans at Olympiacos' home, from which 7,030 were the supporters of the hosts.

Final

UEFA Champions League

All times at CET

Group stage

Olympiacos, in their 11th consecutive presence in the competition, were drawn into Group C with Real Madrid, Werder Bremen and Lazio. The Reds started their campaign with a 1–1 draw behind closed doors at the Karaiskákis Stadium against Lazio, but on the second day, Olympiacos made their first ever away win in the Champions League and stopped their run of 31 matches without a success on their travels with a 3–1 win over Werder Bremen at Weserstadion, turning the game around from 0–1. After, they travelled to Santiago Bernabéu Stadium as leaders of Group C, where they were defeated 2–4 to Real Madrid after a heart-breaking match in which the Greek team was playing with ten men from the 13th minute and was leading the score to the 68th with 2–1, turning it around from 0–1. Real Madrid scored their third goal in the 83rd, but Olympiacos came close to score many times during the last minutes of the match and leave Madrid with the draw, when Real secured the win with a last-minute goal.

In the return legs of the group stage, Olympiacos produced a determined display to earn a point against Real Madrid, in the goalless draw at the Karaiskakis Stadium, keeping alive the record of being undefeated by Real in Athens in four matches. The Reds moved a step closer to qualifying for the last 16 after coming from behind to defeat Lazio 2–1 in Rome's Stadio Olimpico, while on the last day, Olympiacos smashed Werder Bremen 3–0 in Athens, which ensured their place in the knockout stage of the tournament.

Standings

Knockout stage

Round of 16
The draw for the first knockout round took place on 21 December, and paired Olympiacos with Chelsea. The two clubs had never met in the past. In the first leg in Athens, Olympiacos held Chelsea to 0–0, a score which left both teams content, Olympiacos because they did not concede a goal in their home and Chelsea because they kept a clean sheet to occupy the driving seat going into the return leg in London. Olympiacos, backed by deafening and frenzied support, refused to be overawed by their English opponents, enjoying the lion's share of possession and chances in a closely contested encounter. The Londoners failed to create one real clear-cut chance against their opponents and their manager Avram Grant said, "The performance could have been better. It's not a bad result. We didn't create a lot of chances, it's disappointing. But its hard to play here. They have good supporters and a well organized team."

In the second leg in London, Chelsea won 3–0. The Blues surprised the Reds and scored very early with their first chance. Olympiacos balanced the game, but the English scored again before the end of the first-half. At the start of the second-half, Chelsea scored for the final time after another error from the Olympiacos defence.

Team kit

|

|

|

|

References

External links
 Olympiacos F.C. official website
 Olympiacos F.C. on ESPN
 UEFA Champions League

Olympiacos F.C. seasons
Olympiacos F.C.
Greek football championship-winning seasons